The Kleinmann–Low Nebula (also known as the Orion KL Nebula) is an active star forming region in the Milky Way galaxy. It is a cluster of stars within a molecular cloud.

The Kleinmann–Low Nebula is at the heart of the Orion Nebula, and is the most active star-forming region in it. Because of the thick dust surrounding it, it is observed primarily with infrared light, since visible light cannot pass through it. Hot stellar winds circulate off large, young, stars in Orion's nebula and heat the surrounding gas. This then causes an explosion that has a finger-like intrusion look. It is named after Douglas Kleinmann and Frank J. Low, who discovered the nebula in 1967. Between 1972 and 1973 a large amount of maps were secured with the Steward and Catalina Observatories telescopes.

The temperature of the dust surrounding the Kleinmann–Low Nebula calculated to be approximately 70 Kelvin. The nebula is estimated to be rather cool at less than 600 Kelvin, yet extremely active when viewed in the far infrared range. Inside of the nebula, the brightest object observed is the Becklin-Neugebauer Object.

The Kleinmann-Low nebula is rich in the molecules HCOOCH3, CH3OCH3 and deuterated methanol, and abundant with nascent stars and planetary systems.

References

Bibliography
 Ferland G. J. Osterbrock Donald E. (2005) Astrophysics of gaseous nebulae and active galactic nuclei University Science Books 

Dark nebulae
Orion molecular cloud complex